Clintonville may refer to:

Places and locations in the United States 
 Clintonville (Columbus, Ohio)
 Clintonville, Pennsylvania
 Clintonville, West Virginia
 Clintonville, Wisconsin
 Clintonville Municipal Airport